Baltay is a rural locality and the administrative center of Baltaysky District of Saratov Oblast, Russia. Population:

References

Rural localities in Saratov Oblast
Volsky Uyezd